Swanburg is an unincorporated community in Timothy Township, Crow Wing County, Minnesota, United States. It is along Crow Wing County Road 1 near Swanburg Road. Nearby places include Pine River, Manhattan Beach, and Crosslake.

References

Unincorporated communities in Crow Wing County, Minnesota
Unincorporated communities in Minnesota